The Gaon Digital Chart of the Gaon Music Chart is a chart that ranks the best-performing songs in South Korea. The data is collected by the Korea Music Content Association. It consists of weekly (listed from Sunday to Saturday), monthly and yearly charts. Below is a list of songs that topped the weekly and monthly charts. The Digital Chart ranks songs according to their performance on the Gaon Download, Streaming, and BGM charts.

Weekly charts

Monthly charts

See also
2013 in South Korean music

References

External links 
 Gaon Digital Chart 

2014 singles
Korea, South singles
2014 in South Korean music